Melvin McClelland (June 1, 1945-July 26, 2010) was a rhythm and blues singer known for his 1973 song "Reward/Synthetic Substitution", the B-side of which was heavily sampled in at least 94 hip hop songs such as "Real Niggaz Don't Die" and "Alwayz into Somethin'" by N.W.A, "O.G. Original Gangster" by Ice-T, "O.P.P." by Naughty by Nature and more recently "My Life" by 50 Cent, Eminem and Adam Levine.

Born in 1945 in Chicago as Melvin McClelland, his career didn't begin with music; rather, in the Armed Forces. After spending a few years singing in Naval bands, he departed the Navy in the mid-1950s. From there, he went from stage to stage until the early 1970s, when in an attempt to boost his career prospects he visited a Queensbridge concert hall intending to use it for self-promotion. Whilst awaiting a meeting with the hall's owner, he encountered the mother of Herb Rooney and it emerged that he wanted a singer to record one of his compositions. After an informal discussion with Rooney himself, Bliss hit the studio to record it; the result was Reward. That song's B-side, "Synthetic Substitution", became one of the most sampled songs of all time. Bliss' label, Sunburst Records, was a sister company of Opal Productions, and in 1974 it went bankrupt, taking Sunburst Records with it; in doing so rendering Bliss a one-hit wonder.

In 2011, a documentary about him, Synthetic Substitution: The Life Story of Melvin Bliss, was released by Peripheral Enterprises. It was produced by Earl Holder.

Death
On July 17, 2010, it was announced by Melvin Bliss, Jr. that Bliss had suffered a heart attack and had been rushed to NewYork–Presbyterian Hospital. Just over a week later, on July 26, 2010, it was announced that Bliss had died.

References

1945 births
2010 deaths
American rhythm and blues singers
Musicians from Chicago